(2) is the eighteenth studio album by British-Australian pop singer Olivia Newton-John, released on 12 November 2002 in Australia. A duets album, the majority of tracks are with Australian artists, along with two American performers (Richard Marx and Michael McDonald). The Peter Allen and Johnny O'Keefe duets are built around archive recordings, with new vocals added by Newton-John.

The album was planned to include the song "True to Yourself", a Vanessa Amorosi song re-recorded as a duet and intended as track two. However, the track was dropped at the last minute due to contractual disagreements between Amorosi's Transistor Music and Newton-John's Universal Music labels. Both women said they felt sad about the situation and clarified that there is no problem between them, but that it was simply a contractual matter.

Track listing

Release and promotion
The album was a great success in Australia, reaching the top 10 in the ARIA Charts, being certified Platinum. A TV special for the album promotion, A Night with Olivia, also aired in the country, featuring John Farnham and Tina Arena as special guests.

Newton-John's 2008 duets album, A Celebration in Song, contains two songs originally released on (2): "Never Far Away" and "Sunburned Country".

Tour

The Australian leg of Newton-John's Heartstrings World Tour also served in the promotion of album. These were the first solo concerts in Australia of Olivia since 1982 and were very well received by the public and critics. New Idea magazine published an article of "the comeback of queen" in 2002, highlighting the success of the album and tour, as well as its induction into the ARIA Hall of Fame.

Personnel
 Olivia Newton-John – lead vocals 
 Steve Nathan – organ (1)
 Rick Nowels – keyboards (2)
 Andrew Bojanic – synthesizer (2, 10), guitars (2, 3, 4, 8), bass (2, 3, 4, 8), drum programming (2), keyboards (4, 8), backing vocals (5)
 Chong Lim – keyboards (3, 5)
 Peter Allen – acoustic piano (4), lead vocals (4)
 Warren "Pig" Morgan – keyboards (7)
 Richard Marx – keyboards (9), lead vocals (9)
 Mike Bukovik – guitars (1)
 Keith Urban – guitars (1), lead vocals (1) 
 Stuart Fraser – guitars (5, 11)
 Tim Pierce – guitars (6, 7, 10)
 Billy Thorpe – guitars (7), lead vocals (7)
 Dai Pritchard – guitars (7)
 Alison Prestwood – bass (1)
 Joe Creighton – bass (5, 11)
 Mark O'Connor – bass (6, 10), keyboards (6, 10, 11)
 Dario Bortolin – bass (7)
 Chris McHugh – drums (1)
 Iki Levy – drum programming (3), drums (6, 10, 11) 
 Bradley Polain – drums (4, 6)
 Angus Burchill – drums (5)
 Mark Kennedy – drums (7)
 Marlen Landin – backing vocals (1)
 Steve Real – backing vocals (1)
 Darren Hayes – lead vocals (2)
 Tina Arena – lead vocals (3)
 Liz Hooper – backing vocals (3, 5)
 David Campbell – lead vocals (5)
 Human Nature – lead and backing vocals (6)
 Johnny O'Keefe – lead vocals (8)
 Jimmy Little – lead vocals (10)
 Michael McDonald – lead vocals (11)

Production
 Producers – Charles Fisher (tracks 1–11); Rick Nowels (track 2); Richard Marx (track 9); Andy Timmons (track 12)
 Additional production on tracks 4 and 8 – Wizards of Oz (Dale Barlow, Tony Buck, Paul Grabosky and Lloyd Swanton)
 Executive producer – Olivia Newton-John
 Engineers – Justin Niebank (track 1); Adam Rhodes (tracks 2, 3, 5, 6, 10 and 11); Tony Wall (tracks 2, 3, 5, 6, 7)
 Assistant engineers – Todd Gunnerson (track 1); Greg Clarke (tracks 2 and 7); Jimi Maroudas (tracks 2, 3, 5, 6, 10 and 11); Paul Rodger (tracks 3, 5 and 6)
 Drum recording on track 4 – Val Garay
 Mixed by Don Smith
 Mix assistants – Joe Brown and Ok Hee Kim
 Mastered by Stephen Marcussen at Marcussen Mastering (Hollywood, CA)
 Photography – Peter Carrette and Michelle Day

Charts and certifications

Weekly charts

Year-end charts

Certifications

References

2002 albums
Albums produced by Richard Marx
Olivia Newton-John albums
Vocal duet albums
Festival Records albums
Albums produced by Rick Nowels
Albums produced by Charles Fisher (producer)